Gerhard Mühlbacher (born March 13, 1975) is an Austrian luger who has competed since 1998. A natural track luger, he won four medals at the FIL World Luge Natural Track Championships with one gold (Mixed team: 2007), one silver (Mixed team: 2011), and two bronzes (Men's doubles: 2003, 2007).

Mühlbacher also earned two medals at the FIL European Luge Natural Track Championships with a silver (men's doubles: 2006) and a bronze (mixed team: 2010).

References
FIL-Luge profile
Natural track European Championships results 1970-2006.
Natural track World Championships results: 1979-2007

External links

 

1975 births
Living people
Austrian male lugers